Little Frog Mountain is a mountain located in southeastern Tennessee in the United States.

Geography
Little Frog Mountain is located within the Cherokee National Forest in Polk County, Tennessee, and anchors the Little Frog Widerness. It consists of a series of ridges roughly running northeast. The Ocoee River flows along its southern base, and the Copper Basin is located directly to the east. Little Frog Mountain is accessible via a series of trails, and the Kimsey Mountain Highway, a forest service road. It may take its name from its nearby taller counterpart, Big Frog Mountain.

References

Mountains of Tennessee
Protected areas of Polk County, Tennessee
Cherokee National Forest
Landforms of Polk County, Tennessee